Histone H2A.Z is a protein that in humans is encoded by the H2AZ1 gene.

Histones are basic nuclear proteins that are responsible for the nucleosome structure of the chromosomal fiber in eukaryotes. Nucleosomes consist of approximately 146 bp of DNA wrapped around a histone octamer composed of pairs of each of the four core histones (H2A, H2B, H3, and H4). The chromatin fiber is further compacted through the interaction of a linker histone, H1, with the DNA between the nucleosomes to form higher order chromatin structures. The H2AFZ gene encodes a replication-independent member of the histone H2A family that is distinct from other members of the family. Studies in mice have shown that this particular histone is required for embryonic development and indicate that lack of functional histone H2A leads to embryonic lethality.

Histone H2AZ is a variant of histone H2A, and is used to mediate the thermosensory response, and is essential to perceive the ambient temperature. Nucleosome occupancy of H2A.Z decreases with temperature, and in vitro assays show that H2A.Z-containing nucleosomes wrap DNA more tightly than canonical H2A nucleosomes in Arabidopsis.(Cell 140: 136–147, 2010) However, some of the other studies (Nat. Genet. 41, 941–945 and Genes Dev., 21, 1519–1529) have shown that incorporation of H2A.Z in nucleosomes, when it co-occurs with H3.3, makes them weaker. Positioning of H2A.Z containing nucleosomes around transcription start sites has now been shown to affect the downstream gene expression.

Recent evidence also points to a role for H2A.Z in repressing a subset of ncRNAs, derepressing CUTs, as well as mediation higher order chromatin structure formation.

References

Further reading

External links 
 PDBe-KB provides an overview of all the structure information available in the PDB for Human Histone H2A.Z

Genes on human chromosome 4